Metco 308 is a graphite cermet powder used to lubricate gas turbine and jet engines. It is applied using a combustion gas spray gun such as the Metco 6p gun or equivalent. It is composed of 85% nickel and 15% graphite, Metco 308 produces what is essentially an oxide-free machine element seal.

Both Metco 307 and 308 have the same chemical structure, but the particle sizes are different. Metco 307 is more abradable and less erosion-resistant than 308.

Composite materials